Michael Todd is a professional rugby union referee who represents the Scottish Rugby Union.

Rugby union career

Referee career

Professional career

He has refereed in the Scottish Premiership. He has also refereed in Scottish Varsity matches.

Todd refereed in his first Super 6 match on the 22 November 2019 when he took charge of Boroughmuir Bears v Heriot's Rugby.

He is a member of the Borders Referee Society. He is on the Scottish Rugby Union's Premier Panel of referees.

International career

Todd has been Assistant Referee for the Belgium v Georgia match in March 2019.

Outside of rugby

Todd is an army reservist and is a trainee accountant.

References

Living people
Scottish rugby union referees
Rugby union officials
Year of birth missing (living people)
Super 6 referees